A solar powered Stirling engine is a heat engine powered by a temperature gradient generated by the sun. Even though Stirling engines can run with a small temperature gradient, it is more efficient to use concentrated solar power.

The mechanical output can be used directly (e.g. pumps) or be used to create electricity.

NASA 
NASA patented a type of solar-powered Stirling engine on August 3, 1976. It used solar energy to pump water from a river, lake, or stream. The purpose of this apparatus is to “provide a low-cost, low-technology pump having particular utility in irrigation systems employed in underdeveloped arid regions of the earth…[using] the basic principles of the Stirling heat engine“.

Meijer 
One design was patented by Roelf J. Meijer in 1987.
His invention combines a heat engine, such as a Stirling cycle engine, with a solar dish collector to produce electricity. This apparatus consists of a large dish that concentrates solar energy to a focal point at the center of the dish. The concentrated solar energy drives Stirling cycle engine,  which operates by letting heat flow from a hot source to a cold sink to do work. The work output of the Stirling cycle then drives a generator to create electric power. Moreover, for optimal heat collection, Meijer’s solar-powered engine requires that the dish always point directly at the sun so no shadows are in the solar dish collector. This presented issues because, for the apparatus to have a complete range of motion, lubrication and rotational systems are necessary, and may compromise structural stability.

Sunvention 
Around 2010, a company called Sunvention Solar Energy created a device similar to the NASA design that they say can pump 100,000 gallons per day, purely off of solar energy and the Stirling cycle, and costing only US$1,250. This apparatus, much like the others, used a large solar dish to collect heat from the sun to create a high temperature source, and also used low temperature water from a nearby stream as its low temperature source. This provided a great temperature range, which in turn provided more power. The apparatus pumped the water into nearby crop fields, providing a “low-cost, low-technology pump having particular utility in irrigation systems employed in underdeveloped arid regions of the earth.”

Comparison to Solar Panels 
Solar-powered Stirling engines are in some situations more efficient in generating electrical energy than solar panels. Thermal capacity and rotating mass result in less sudden changes in output power. Experiments show the possibility of higher efficiencies.

Solar-powered Stirling engines are less scalable than solar panels.
They are also more complex than a solar-electric system.

Solar-powered Stirling engines can have a secondary heat source (e.g. Gas), allowing operation during night and when the sky is clouded.

See also 
 Solar thermal energy#Dish designs
 Stirling Energy Systems

References

External links

Stirling engines
Solar thermal energy